SRF Limited is an Indian multi-business chemicals conglomerate engaged in the manufacturing of industrial and specialty intermediates. The company’s business portfolio covers fluorochemicals, specialty chemicals, packaging films, technical textiles, coated and laminated fabrics. It has a workforce of more than 7,000 employees working across eleven manufacturing plants in India and one each in Thailand, South Africa and Hungary. The company exports to more than 90 countries.

History
The company was established in 1970, as Shri Ram Fibres Limited, by DCM Limited as a wholly owned subsidiary. Its initial focus was on the manufacture of tyre cord fabrics. Its first manufacturing plant was set up in Manali, near Chennai, in 1973.

In 1986, the company set up a joint venture with Denso, SRF Nippondenso, for the manufacture of automotive components. This was later spun off as a separate company in 1993. Another subsidiary, SRF Finance, started in 1986 was sold to GE Capital in 1997. SRF also had a health-care division which manufactured plastic optical lenses, which was spun off as a separate company in 1997.

In 1989, the company entered the Chemicals Business to manufacture refrigerants. Consequently, in 1990, it changed its name to SRF Limited.

The company started its Packaging Films Business in 1995 when it acquired a BOPET film plant at Kashipur in India from M/s Flow more. SRF has since then grown beyond the national boundaries and become one of the leading manufacturers of both BOPET and BOPP films globally.

With deep knowledge of Fluorine since the early 1980s, the company entered the Specialty Chemicals Business in 2004 as a supplier of fine chemicals to the agrochemicals and pharmaceuticals industry. The business has a rich experience of close to three decades in Custom Synthesis, Contract Research and Manufacturing.

SRF Limited was listed in the 2011 Asia's Best under a Billion list by Forbes magazine.

Business Segments

Technical Textiles Business 
SRF is the largest manufacturer of technical textiles and textile oriented in India. SRF’s product basket for technical textiles contains tyre cord fabrics, belting fabrics, and industrial yarn.

Fluorochemicals Business 
Set up in the year 1989, SRF’s Fluoro chemicals Business drives its work through the sale of refrigerants, pharma propellants, and industrial chemicals. The company has allocated capital to enter the Fluoro polymers business.

Specialty Chemicals Business 
SRF's Specialty Chemicals Business is involved in the development and production of advanced intermediates for Agrochemical and Pharmaceutical applications.

Packaging Films Business 
SRF's Packaging Films Business manufactures BOPET and BOPP films for use in industries as diverse as food and non-food packaging, labelling, industrial and various other end applications.

Market Leadership 
The company is a market leader in most of its business segments in India and commands a significant global presence in some of its businesses/products, namely Difluoro & Trifluoro Alkyl Intermediates (global no. 1), Nylon 6 Tyre Cord (global no. 2) and Belting Fabrics (global no. 3). SRF is the only Indian manufacturer of ozone friendly refrigerants, namely F 134a and F 32, both of which it has developed using indigenous technology. With the addition of F 125, SRF is now the largest producer and seller of refrigerants in India and has further consolidated its market leadership. SRF obtained ASHRAE (American Society of Heating, Refrigeration, Air-conditioning Engineers) certification for R-467A, its low GWP refrigerant blend for stationary air-conditioning applications. It is the first-ever refrigerant from India to have received this certification by the ASHRAE Standards Committee under the Designation and Safety Classification of Refrigerants. SRF acquired the Dymel® HFA 134a/P regulated medical pharmaceutical propellant business from DuPont™ in January 2015 and became one of the few manufacturers of Pharma grade HFA 134a/P in the world.

Awards 

 Deming Prize for the Tyre Cord Business in 2004 
 Deming Prize for Chemicals Business in 2012 
 ICC (Indian Chemical Council) Lifetime Achievement Award to Chairman, Arun Bharat Ram 
 Sword of Honour by the British Safety Council in 2018 
 The Economic Times Family Business of the Year (Large Companies) Award in 2019 
 National CSR Award 2018 in the category – Corporate Awards in CSR in Challenging Circumstances – North by the President of India, Shri Ram Nath Kovind 
 EY Entrepreneur of the Year 2019 in the manufacturing category conferred on Chairman, Mr. Arun Bharat Ram 
Ashish Bharat Ram, Managing Director of SRF Ltd. named India’s Best CEO in the emerging companies category by Business Today in January, 2021 
Best Family Business award in the giga category at the first-ever Indian Family Business Awards 2021, presented by Moneycontrol 
Employer of the Future 2022 by Fortune India

References 

Indian companies established in 1970
Manufacturing companies based in Gurgaon
1970 establishments in Haryana
Chemical companies of India
Chemical companies established in 1970
Companies listed on the National Stock Exchange of India
Companies listed on the Bombay Stock Exchange